Mary Jane Sears (born May 10, 1939) is an American former competition swimmer and Olympic medalist.  She represented the United States at the 1956 Summer Olympics in Melbourne, Australia, where she won a bronze medal for her third-place finish (1:14.4) in the women's 100-meter butterfly, finishing behind fellow Americans Shelley Mann and Nancy Ramey.  She also competed in the women's 200-meter breaststroke, finishing seventh in the event final with a time of 2:57.2.

See also
 List of Olympic medalists in swimming (women)

External links
 
 

1939 births
Living people
American female butterfly swimmers
Olympic bronze medalists for the United States in swimming
Sportspeople from Portsmouth, Virginia
Swimmers at the 1955 Pan American Games
Swimmers at the 1956 Summer Olympics
Medalists at the 1956 Summer Olympics
Pan American Games gold medalists for the United States
Pan American Games silver medalists for the United States
Pan American Games medalists in swimming
Medalists at the 1955 Pan American Games